The Lutheran School of Nursing was a for-profit nursing school in St. Louis, Missouri. Based at the campus of the Saint Alexius Hospital Jefferson campus, the school offered a 26-month graduate diploma program. The school was credited by the Accreditation Commission for Education in Nursing.

The school, which operated for 124 years, faced budget issues and a high rate of turnover. A report conducted by the Missouri State Board of Nursing in September 2019 yielded financial concerns, faculty turnover, aging facilities, and low exam pass rates. In December 2019, the school ceased the admittance of new students. In 2020, the Missouri State Board of Nursing planned a preliminary hearing on whether or not to shut down the school, but the meeting was postponed.
On July 29, 2022, the director of the program announced on the alumni webpage on Facebook, "The owners have decided to close the school effective immediately."

References 

Nursing schools in Missouri
Education in St. Louis County, Missouri
For-profit universities and colleges in the United States